Heart of America is a 12-metre class yacht that competed in the 1987 Louis Vuitton Cup. The boat was helmed by Buddy Melges and represented the  Chicago Yacht Club. The boat finished 8 of 13 in Louis Vuitton Cup, which decides the challenger to the Cup holder.

The Chicago-based yacht design firm of Graham & Schlageter contributed to the boat's design.

Crew
The crew included these members, as well as others.
 Buddy Melges - Skipper
 David Dellenbaugh - Tactician
 Larry Mialik - Grinder
 Richie Stearns - main trimmer and sail co-coordinator
 Andreas Josenhans - Trimmer
 Dave Navin
 Jim Gretzky
 Wally Henry
 Fred Stritt
 John Stanley
John Spence

Support
The CEOs of the Heart of America Cup effort included Alan Johnston and William Bentsen.

Corporate sponsorship of the drive started with MCI providing $1M US dollars to the campaign.

Controversies
The challenge by a Great Lakes yacht club resulted in the Australian Royal Perth Yacht club challenging whether Lake Michigan was an "arm of the sea" as required by the Deed of Gift of the America's Cup. The court decided that Lake Michigan did constitute an "arm of the sea" and that the Club could challenge for the America's Cup.

References

12-metre class yachts
Sailing yachts of the United States
Louis Vuitton Cup yachts